Nipisa is a genus of southeast Asian cellar spiders erected in 2018 after a molecular phylogenetic study of Pholcidae. It consists of ten Calapnita species, previously the phyllicola group of Pholcidae, now elevated to genus rank. They are pale whitish in color, with a cylindrical abdomen and relatively long legs. The name is derived from the Malay "nipis", meaning "thin", in reference to the long, thin abdomen.

Species
 it contains ten species:
N. anai (Huber, 2017) – Thailand, Malaysia (mainland), Singapore, Indonesia (Sumatra, Java?)
N. bankirai (Huber, 2017) – Malaysia, Indonesia (Borneo)
N. bidayuh (Huber, 2017) – Malaysia (Borneo)
N. deelemanae (Huber, 2011) – Malaysia (Borneo)
N. kubah (Huber, 2017) – Malaysia (Borneo)
N. lehi (Huber, 2017) – Malaysia (Borneo)
N. phasmoides (Deeleman-Reinhold, 1986) – Indonesia (Java, Sumatra, Borneo)
N. phyllicola (Deeleman-Reinhold, 1986) (type) – Thailand, Malaysia (mainland, Borneo), Indonesia (Sumatra, Borneo), Singapore
N. semengoh (Huber, 2011) – Malaysia (Borneo)
N. subphyllicola (Deeleman-Reinhold, 1986) – Philippines

See also
 Calapnita
 List of Pholcidae species

References

Further reading

Pholcidae genera
Spiders of Asia